The 1930 Grand National was the 89th renewal of the Grand National horse race that took place at Aintree Racecourse near Liverpool, England, on 29 March 1930.

The race was won by 100/8 shot Shaun Goilin. The 10-year-old was ridden by jockey Tommy Cullinan and trained by Frank Hartigan, for owner Walter Midwood. Melleray's Belle finished in second place, Sir Lindsay was third and Glangesia fourth.

Forty-one horses ran and all but one returned safely to the stables. Derby Day was fatally injured in a fall.

Finishing order

Non-finishers

References

 1930
Grand National
Grand National
20th century in Lancashire